The following is a list of characters on the late night program Late Night with Conan O'Brien, which aired on NBC from 1993 to 2009.

Characters 
 A-hole Ronald
 Andy's Little Sister
 Artie Kendall's Ghost
 Awareness Del (Making People Aware of Delaware)
 Cactus Chef Playing "We Didn't Start the Fire" on the Flute.
 Camel Toe Annie
 Coked Up Werewolf
 Conando
 The Dancing Gorillas
 Euro Guy
 Evil Puppy
 The FedEx Pope.
 Fidel Castro Rabbit DJ
 Gaseous Wiener
 Ginger
 Gun-toting, NASCAR Driving Jesus
 Hannigan, The Traveling Salesman
 Hippie Fire Hydrant Riding a Skateboard
 Horny Manatee
 Jeremy and Ira
 Kloppy the Horse
 Little Jay Leno
 The Loser
 Mansy, half man-half pansy
 Man with bulletproof legs
 Masturbating Bear
 MC Scared-of-Beez
 Money shot Lincoln 
 "No Reason to Live" Guy
 Carl "Oldy" Olson
 Oscillating Air Purifier that Looks Like Slash
 Pimpbot 5000
 Polly, the NBC Peacock
 Preparation H Raymond
 The Pubes Guy
 Quackers the S*** Eating Duck
 Quake Guy
 R2-Mr. T2
 Redneck Parking Meter Eating Nachos out of a Roman Coliseum
 Robot on a Toilet
 Sears Tower in Sears Clothing
 Seven-Foot Groucho
 Shoeverine
 S&M Lincoln
 Stealthy Frankenstein 
 Suicidal Cow
 The Interrupter
 The Really Tall Dachshund
 The Reverend Otis K. Dribbles
 Triumph the Insult Comic Dog
 Tomari
 Vomiting Kermit

See also
List of Late Night with Conan O'Brien sketches

Characters
Late Night With Conan O'Brien